Thyra Kigho Deshaun Oji, better known by her stage name Ms Banks, is a British rapper, singer and songwriter from Camberwell, London. Oji has released three mixtapes as Ms Banks. In 2014, she released her first mixtape titled Once Upon a Grind. She then released her first EP titled New Chapter EP in 2016. The Coldest Winter Ever was released in 2018, followed by The Coldest Winter Ever Part II in 2019.

Early life
She was born to a Nigerian father and a Ugandan mother. Oji began writing music at age 11 and she came from very musical family. Banks grew up in South London – just off Walworth Road in Elephant and Castle – and has been grafting away for sometime, revered by her peers for her pairing of technical skill with soul-searching lyricism.

Influences
Ms Banks has cited Nicki Minaj as her biggest influence. She also cites Ms Dynamite, Estelle, Lauryn Hill, Lil’ Kim, Foxy Brown and Monie Love as her influences.

Discography

Mixtapes

Singles

As lead artist

As featured artist

References

Black British women rappers
Living people
People from Camberwell
Rappers from London
English people of Nigerian descent
English people of Ugandan descent
Year of birth missing (living people)